Michael Taylor may refer to:

Entertainment
 Mick Taylor (born 1949), former member of the Rolling Stones
 Mick Taylor (album)
 Michael Taylor (film producer), American film producer and academic
 Michael Taylor (screenwriter) (born 1969), American science fiction TV writer

Politics and government
 Michael Angelo Taylor (1757–1834), English politician
 Michael Taylor (political scientist) (born 1942), American political theorist and political economist
 Michael R. Taylor, Deputy Commissioner for Foods at the FDA

Sports
 Michael Henry Taylor (1918–2005), English swimmer
 Michael Taylor (Australian footballer) (born 1953), for Collingwood and Norwood
 Michael Taylor (Australian cricketer) (born 1955)
 Michael Taylor (American football), (born c. 1968) quarterback for the University of Michigan football team, 1987–1989
 Michael Taylor (English footballer) (born 1982)
 Michael Taylor (baseball, born 1985), American baseball outfielder
 Michael Taylor (swimmer) (born 1989), swimmer from the Marshall Islands
 Michael A. Taylor (born 1991), American baseball outfielder

Other
 Michael Waistell Taylor (1824–1892), Scottish physician and antiquary
 Michael Taylor (designer) (1927–1986), American interior designer
 Michael Taylor (British killer) (born 1944), British killer notable for alleged demonic possession
 Michael Taylor (glass artist) (born 1944), American studio glass artist, teacher and lecturer
 Michael E. Taylor (born 1946), American mathematician
 Michael Taylor (forester) (born 1966), discoverer of champion and tallest trees
 Michael Taylor (American murderer) (1967–2014), convicted murderer from Missouri
 Michael R. Taylor (museum director), Hood Museum of Art at Dartmouth College
 Michael P. Taylor (born 1968), British computer programmer and paleontologist
 Michael Taylor (historian) (born 1988), Northern Irish historian and former cricketer
Michael Taylor, convicted for aiding fugitive of justice Carlos Ghosn

See also
 Mike Taylor (disambiguation)